An exosite is a secondary binding site, remote from the active site, on an enzyme or other protein.

This is similar to allosteric sites, but differs in the fact that, in order for an enzyme to be active, its exosite typically must be occupied. Exosites have recently become a topic of increased interest in biomedical research as potential drug targets.

References

External links 
 

Enzymes
Catalysis